Suffasia attidiya, is a species of spider of the genus Suffasia. It is endemic to Sri Lanka. The species was documented only from female specimens found from Bellanwila-Attidiya marsh, situated on the south-eastern outskirts of Colombo. The first male specimen was found in 2005.

See also
 List of Zodariidae species

References

Spiders described in 2000
Zodariidae
Endemic fauna of Sri Lanka
Spiders of Asia